Ferenc András Kalmár (born 1955) is a Hungarian physicist and politician, member of the National Assembly (MP) from Fidesz–KDNP Csongrád County Regional List between 2010 and 2014.

Kalmár was born in Brașov, Romania into an ethnic Hungarian family. He attended University of Bucharest, where he graduated in 1980. On 1 April 2015, he was appointed Ministerial Commissioner for Hungary's Neighbourhood Policy by Foreign Minister Péter Szijjártó.

Personal life
He is married and has two children.

References

1955 births
Living people
University of Bucharest alumni
Budapest University of Technology and Economics alumni
Romanian people of Hungarian descent
20th-century Hungarian physicists
Christian Democratic People's Party (Hungary) politicians
Members of the National Assembly of Hungary (2010–2014)
People from Brașov